Dubec or Dubets (Ukrainian: Дубець transliteration: Dubec') is a Slavic surname found in the Balkans, Russia and Ukraine. The name roughly translates to "whip", "rod", "twig", "switch", "withe" or "withy". The name is considered uncommon.

References

Surnames of Slavic origin